Apochiton is a genus of East African plants in the grass family. The only known species is Apochiton burttii, native to the Kondoa District of north-central Tanzania.

See also 
 List of Poaceae genera

References 

Chloridoideae
Grasses of Africa
Endemic flora of Tanzania
Kondoa District
Monotypic Poaceae genera
Taxa named by James Edward Smith